The National Monuments of Colombia are the set of properties, nature reserves, archaeological sites, historic districts, urban areas and property that, for values of authenticity, originality, aesthetics, and artistic techniques, are representative  of Colombia and constitute core elements of its history and culture. The cultural heritage of Colombia includes material and immaterial assets "which are an expression of the Colombian nationality", in accordance with Law No. 1185 (2008). As of December 2011, 1079 National Monuments have been declared. A further sixteen candidate sites have been identified for future declaration.

The regulation, management, and safeguarding of tangible and intangible cultural heritage of the nation is under the control of the Ministry of Culture through the National Heritage Council.

The National Monuments of Colombia list contains 8 monuments that have also been declared UNESCO World Heritage Sites, including the following:

For the complete list of national monuments, see List of National Monuments of Colombia.

See also

 History of Colombia
 Culture of Colombia
 List of heritage registers

References

External links
  Patrimonio Cultural de la Nación

 
Colombian culture
Colombia